Lieutenant Gavin Lynedoch Graham (18 October 1894—17 June 1963) DFC, LdH, CdG was a South African World War I flying ace credited with thirteen confirmed aerial victories.

Aerial service
Graham served with the 18th Hussars from April 1915 through August 1916 before transferring to the Royal Flying Corps. He put in 200 hours flight time as an observer in No. 70 Squadron RFC before being sent to pilot's training in March 1917. On 14 December, he was assigned to No. 73 Squadron RFC as a Sopwith Camel pilot. He scored his first win on 3 May 1918, scored steadily, and on 19 July he became an ace. His next victory, two days later, came during a squadron patrol that destroyed a Fokker Dr.I triplane, and was shared with Major Maurice Le Blanc-Smith, Lieutenant William Sidebottom, Lieutenant William Stephenson, Second Lieutenant Robert Chandler, and two other pilots, with every pilot credited with a win. He would not share a triumph again until his eleventh on 8 August; then he teamed with Chandler and Captain Emile John Lussier to destroy an enemy two-seater reconnaissance plane, for his sole win over a two-seater. On the 25th, he destroyed a Fokker D.VII and teamed with another British pilot to drive down another one out of control. Graham finished his war with over 250 flight hours as a pilot, nine destroyed enemy machines to his credit, three enemy fighters driven down out of control, and one enemy plane captured. On 2 November 1918, he received the Distinguished Flying Cross, being lauded as:

Aerial victory list

References

1894 births
1963 deaths
Recipients of the Distinguished Flying Cross (United Kingdom)
South African World War I flying aces
South African people of British descent
White South African people
Recipients of the Croix de Guerre 1914–1918 (France)
Recipients of the Legion of Honour
People from Makhanda, Eastern Cape